Shock tactics, shock tactic, or shock attack is the name of an offensive maneuver which attempts to place the enemy under psychological pressure by a rapid and fully-committed advance with the aim of causing their combatants to retreat. The acceptance of a higher degree of risk to attain a decisive result is intrinsic to shock actions.

Pre-modern
Shock tactics were usually performed by heavy cavalry, but were sometimes achieved by heavy infantry. The most famous shock tactic is the medieval cavalry charge. This shock attack was conducted by heavily armoured cavalry armed with lances, usually couched, galloping at full speed against an enemy formation.

Modern
After the introduction of firearms, the use of the cavalry charge as a common military tactic waned. Infantry shock action required the holding of fire until the enemy was in very close range, and was used in defence as well as attack. The favorite tactic of the Duke of Wellington was for the infantry to fire a volley and then give a loud cheer and charge. The increasing firepower of machine guns, mortars, and artillery made this tactic increasingly hazardous. World War I saw the infantry charge at its worst, when masses of soldiers made frontal, and often disastrous, attacks on entrenched enemy positions.

Shock tactics began to be viable again with the invention of the tank. During World War II, the Germans adapted shock tactics to modern mechanized warfare, known as blitzkrieg, which gained considerable achievements during the war and was afterwards adopted by most modern armies.

The US tactic of shock and awe during the Second Gulf War was a shock tactic based on overwhelming military superiority on land and unchallenged dominance in naval and aerial warfare.

Famous examples
The charge of the Polish cavalry (September 12, 1683) at the Battle of Vienna in the Great Turkish War. 
Charge of the Light Brigade (October 25, 1854) at the Battle of Balaklava in the Crimean War.
Pickett's Charge (July 3, 1863) at the Battle of Gettysburg in the American Civil War.
Charge of the 21st Lancers (September 2, 1898) at the Battle of Omdurman in the Mahdist War: the last cavalry charge in battle by a British cavalry unit.
Battle of Beersheba (October 31, 1917) in World War I: one of the last successful cavalry charges in history.
Charge at Krojanty (September 1, 1939) in World War II: a cavalry charge that gave birth to the myth of Polish cavalry charging German armoured vehicles.

Shock units

Cavalry
Hetairoi
Cataphracts
Clibanarii
Polish Hussars
Cuirassiers
Lancers
Knights
Gendarme (historical)

Infantry
Phalanx
Hoplites
Caroleans

Mechanized
Tank

See also
Cavalry tactics
Charge (warfare)
Close combat
Close quarters battle
List of military tactics
Melee
Military doctrine
Military history
Shock units
Special forces

References

Military tactics
Land warfare